Peter Bernhard Kyne (October 12, 1880 – November 25, 1957) was an American novelist who published between 1904 and 1940. He was born and died in San Francisco, California. Many of his works were adapted into screenplays starting during the silent film era, particularly his first novel, The Three Godfathers, which was published in 1913 and proved to be a huge success. More than 100 films were adapted from his works between 1914 and 1952, many of the earliest without consent or compensation. Kyne created the character of Cappy Ricks in a series of novels.

Early years

The son of cattle rancher John Kyne and Mary Cresham, young Kyne worked on his father's ranch then attended a business college where he decided to become a writer.

The Uncle of WWII Veteran, Joseph R. Kyne.  Great Uncle to Dennis Joseph Kyne. 
Great grand Uncle to the last living Kyne, decorated Desert Storm Veteran, award-winning author, musician, Dennis Joseph Kyne, Jr.

Written works

Military service
When still younger than 18 years old, he lied about his age and enlisted with Company L, 14th U.S. Infantry nicknamed "the Golden Dragons", which served in the Philippines from 1898 to 1899. The Spanish–American War and the struggle for Philippine independence led by General Emilio Aguinaldo provided background for many of Kyne's later stories. During World War I, he served as a captain of Battery A of the California National Guard 144th Field Artillery Regiment, known as the "California Grizzlies".

Partial filmography

 The Parson of Panamint (1916)
The Light in Darkness (1917)
 One Touch of Nature (1917)
The Valley of the Giants (1919)
Red Courage (1921)
The Ten Dollar Raise (1921)
A Motion to Adjourn (1921)
The Innocent Cheat (1921)
Brothers Under the Skin (1922)
Kindred of the Dust (1922)
The Pride of Palomar (1922)
 Back to Yellow Jacket (1922)
Making a Man (1922)
 One Eighth Apache (1922)
Loving Lies (1924)
Never the Twain Shall Meet (1925)
The Enchanted Hill (1926)
The Shamrock Handicap (1926)
Breed of the Sea (1926)
Pals in Paradise (1926)
The Understanding Heart (1927)
The Man in Hobbles (1928)
The Pride of the Legion (1932)
Heroes of the West (1932 serial)
Gordon of Ghost City (1933)
Hot Off the Press (1935)
Bars of Hate (1935)
The Fighting Coward (1935)
Headline Crasher (1936)
A Face in the Fog (1936)
 Code of the Range (1936)
Taming the Wild (1936)
Born to Fight (1936)
The Go Getter (1937)
Flaming Frontiers (1938 serial)

Adaptations of The Three Godfathers

The Three Godfathers (1916)
Marked Men (1919) considered a lost film
Action (1921) considered a lost film
Hell's Heroes (1929), uncredited
Three Godfathers (1936)
3 Godfathers (1948), starring John Wayne
The Godchild (made-for-TV, 1974)
Walker, Texas Ranger episode "A Ranger Christmas" 12/21/96, loosely adapted, uncredited
Tokyo Godfathers (2003), loosely adapted, uncredited

Popular culture
The Tracy High School football field and MVP trophy are named after Kyne, whose Bohemian Club friends orchestrated the naming in 1927, Kyne and his Bohemian club friends funded early Tracy High School athletic programs and purchased the land for the eponymous Peter B. Kyne Field.
A wooden sign in Sequoia Park in Eureka, California, bears a quote from Kyne's The Valley of the Giants: "I'm not going to cut the timber in this valley. I haven't the heart to destroy God's most wonderful handiwork. 'Twas in her mind to give her Valley of the Giants to Sequoia (Eureka) for a city park." In Kyne's Humboldt-inspired book The Valley of the Giants, a timber baron's wife's wish of saving a favorite stand of redwoods and creating a park in the middle of a city is made possible by her husband after her death.

References

External links

Biography from the Literature Network

Past Peter B. Kyne Trophy winners (Tracy High School in Tracy, California)

1880 births
1957 deaths
20th-century American novelists
20th-century American male writers
American male novelists
American male screenwriters
American military personnel of the Spanish–American War
American military personnel of World War I
Screenwriters from California
Writers from San Francisco
20th-century American screenwriters
American Western (genre) novelists